«Seven Star Hotel» is the fourth studio album by the Russian pop rock band Be Good.

Track listing

Bonus tracks

Personnel 
 Vladimir Gustov - guitars, keyboards, bass, vocals, percussion, production, programming
 Igor Balakirev - vocals
 Boris Majorov - bass (12)
 Peter Miheev - drums (12)

External links
 Be Good at Myspace.com

2009 albums